Gilbert Shuldham Shaw (10 July 1886 in Dublin – 18 August 1967 in Convent of the Incarnation, Fairacres, Oxford) was an Anglo-Irish Church of England priest, from 1940 vicar of St Anne's Soho.  His maternal grandfather was Sir Philip Crampton Smyly, honorary physician to Queen Victoria, and he was baptised by his mother's uncle, William Conyngham Plunket, archbishop of Dublin. He was closely associated with the Community of the Sisters of the Love of God from 1962 until his death.

With Patrick McLaughlin, he is thought to be part of the inspiration for the character of Father Hugh Chantry-Pigg in Rose Macaulay's The Towers of Trebizond.

References

Further reading 
Hacking, Rod (1986) "Gilbert Shaw (1886-1967)", in: Fairacres Chronicle; vol. 19, no. 2, summer 1986, pp. 6–10
Shaw, Gilbert (1986) "Response to the Spirit: Fr Gilbert with the nuns at Fairacres, December 1962", in: Fairacres Chronicle; vol. 19, no. 2, summer 1986, pp. 11–21

External links 
 DNB article

1886 births
1967 deaths
20th-century Church of England clergy